Michael Longabardi (born February 23, 1973) is an American basketball coach for the Atlanta Hawks. He was previously an assistant coach in the NBA for the Houston Rockets, Boston Celtics, and Phoenix Suns, winning an NBA Finals championship with both the Celtics and Cavaliers.

Early life and college career
Longabardi was born and raised in Brooklyn, New York, and attended Xaverian High School, a private Catholic school. He went on to play basketball at Newberry College where he earned the nickname "Mr. Defense." After two years at Newberry College, Longabardi transferred to Frostburg State University. He graduated from Frostburg State with a bachelor's degree in Health and Physical Education.

College coaching career
Longabardi began his career as an assistant head coach for Pfeiffer University. After one season at Pfeiffer, Longabardi took a position as assistant coach at Adelphi University. Adelphi made two consecutive NCAA Division II Men's Basketball Championship appearances in 1998 and 1999.

In 2000, he took a job as an assistant coach at Lafayette College, where he helped guide the team to a Patriot League Title and an NCAA Tournament appearance. In 2002, he became an assistant coach at Towson University.

NBA coaching career

Houston Rockets
During the summer of 2001, Longabardi helped coach the NACEL Open Door College All-Star Team with Bill Van Gundy, the father of both Stan Van Gundy and Jeff Van Gundy. When Jeff Van Gundy was hired as the new head coach of the Houston Rockets in 2003, he hired Longabardi to join the staff.

In his first year in Houston, he was as the assistant video coordinator and one year later he was promoted to lead video coordinator.

Boston Celtics
In 2007, Longabardi was hired by the Boston Celtics as an assistant coach. He worked under Doc Rivers and Tom Thibodeau. In his first season with the Celtics, the team went on to win the NBA Championship, defeating the Los Angeles Lakers 4–2.

In 2009, Longabardi became the Celtics full-time defensive coordinator.

Phoenix Suns
On June 25, 2013, Mike Longabardi became an assistant coach for the Phoenix Suns under head coach Jeff Hornacek. In Longabardi's first year, the Suns had a record of 48–34, which was a drastic improvement from the previous year (25–57).

Cleveland Cavaliers
In 2016, Longabardi was hired by the Cleveland Cavaliers to be their defensive coordinator under head coach Tyronn Lue. In his first year with the team, the Cavaliers won the NBA Championship.

Washington Wizards
On August 1, 2019, Longabardi was hired as an assistant coach by the Washington Wizards under head coach Scott Brooks.

References

1973 births
Living people
American men's basketball coaches
American men's basketball players
Basketball coaches from New York (state)
Basketball players from New York City
Boston Celtics assistant coaches
Cleveland Cavaliers assistant coaches
Frostburg State University alumni
Houston Rockets assistant coaches
Lafayette Leopards men's basketball coaches
Newberry Wolves men's basketball players
Phoenix Suns assistant coaches
Sacramento Kings assistant coaches
Sportspeople from Brooklyn
Towson Tigers men's basketball coaches
Washington Wizards assistant coaches